Van Richten's Guide to the Created is an accessory for the 2nd edition of the Advanced Dungeons & Dragons fantasy role-playing game.

Contents
Van Richten's Guide to the Created discusses the manufacture of golems in detail, touching on material procurement, mental development, and brain transplants. A section on "Body Parts and Decay" tells how long it takes a corpse to rot under various climatic conditions; for example, a brain kept indoors should stay fresh for a couple of days. The "Nutritional Requirement" rules advise that a thoughtful master should feed his golem a suckling pig at least once a week.

Publication history
Van Richten's Guide to the Created was written by Teeuwynn Woodruff, and published by TSR, Inc.

Reception
Rick Swan reviewed Van Richten's Guide to the Created for Dragon magazine #207 (July 1994). He reviewed this book with the adventure Adam's Wrath, and commented that the "AD&D game meets Frankenstein in these first-rate supplements for the Ravenloft setting." He commented on the "lurid detail" on golem creation: "What makes this the most memorable entry in the Van Richten's line is Woodruff's gleeful commentary about the, er, visceral consequences."

References

Ravenloft supplements
Role-playing game supplements introduced in 1994